The 1988 Peach Bowl may refer to:

 The 1987 season Peach Bowl - January 2, 1988, game between the Tennessee Volunteers and the Indiana Hoosiers
 The 1988 season Peach Bowl - December 31, 1988, game between the NC State Wolfpack and the Iowa Hawkeyes